Bruce Mathiske is a Newcastle-based virtuoso solo guitarist who has released 17 plus albums. Mathiske has studied both jazz and classical music.

His large finger span enables him to play Rhythm Lead and bass at the same time, giving the impression that more than one person is playing guitar.

Personal life 
He was born in 1963 and hails from Swan Hill. At the age of seven, he started studying music, and he has continued to do so throughout his life. At the age of fifteen, he relocated to Bendigo, where he studied classical guitar. He would practice for up to ten hours a day.

When he was 18, he was accidentally shot whilst out spotlighting. This led to paralysis in his arm for over a year. This was later followed by a battle with hepatitis.

He has toured Europe, North America and Japan, and has made appearances at various festivals.

Influences 
Bruce credits Chet Atkins as being his major influence, however he also lists artists such as B.B. King, Lenny Breau, Barney Kessell, Robin Ford, Leo Kottke and Tommy Emmanuel

Discography 
Sourced from Discogs

References

1963 births
Musicians from Victoria (Australia)
Australian guitarists
Living people